Power Blade 2, known in Japan as , is an platform game by Taito for the Nintendo Entertainment System/Family Computer. It is the sequel to the game Power Blade. Due to it being released late in the system's life-cycle, it is notoriously difficult to find and is one of the more valuable games for the console.

Summary and gameplay

The game takes place in the year 2200 and follows NOVA, the protagonist from the first Power Blade game, as he sets out on a mission from the U.S. Department of Defense to destroy the Delta Foundation, who has created a new cyborg that can threaten global security if it falls into the wrong hands. Just as in Power Blade, this game is similar in gameplay to the Mega Man series in that the player has the freedom to select any stage to play. It also adds some new features also seen in the Mega Man series, such as the ability of the player to slide and a wide assortment of weaponry.

Power Blade 2 was made first in North America and was then released in Japan with the title Captain Saver. As in the first game, the title comes from a special power-up called the "Power Suit", which gives the player additional firepower capabilities.

The object of the game is to destroy the Delta Foundation. The player can choose the order of the first four levels/buildings before unlocking Area 5. The goal in each building is to destroy the boss in order to destroy the building. After the player defeats the Area 5 boss, the game proceeds to the final level.

One of the biggest changes to this game was the addition of four collectible power suits. Instead of finding a temporary power suit, the player can collect four powerful suits by defeating a mid level bosses. The four suits are the Newtsuit, which lets the player climb the ceiling and walls, the Wet Suit, which allows the player to swim, the Rocket Suit, which lets the player fly, and a defensive suit called the Patriot Suit.

Plot
December 24, 2200; The Delta Foundation, a weapons research company, developed a new cyborg soldier. The U.S. President was told that if the government did not buy it within the week, they would sell it to another government, which would pose a threat if it fell into the hands of a hostile government. Nova is given a secret mission from the U.S. Department of Defense to destroy the Delta Foundation.

Reception
Power Blade 2 was one of the featured articles in the October 1992 issue of Nintendo Power magazine. Power Blade 2 was one of the featured articles in the September 1992 issue of Electric Gaming Monthly magazine, in which they gave the game a rating of 5.5/10.

References

External links

1992 video games
Natsume (company) games
Nintendo Entertainment System games
Nintendo Entertainment System-only games
Platform games
Taito games
Video game sequels
Video games scored by Kinuyo Yamashita
Video games developed in Japan